Schinia gabrielae is a moth of the family Noctuidae. It is found in Chile.

References 

Schinia
Fauna of Chile
Moths of South America
Endemic fauna of Chile
Moths described in 1998